Frank Edward Evans (September 6, 1923 – June 3, 2010) was an American lawyer, politician, and World War II veteran who served seven terms as a U.S. Representative from Colorado from 1965 to 1979.

Early life and education
Born in Pueblo, Colorado, Evans attended public schools in Colorado Springs. He entered Pomona College in Claremont, California, in 1941. During World War II, he interrupted his education in 1943 to serve in the United States Navy as a patrol pilot from 1943 to 1946.

He attended the University of Denver for his B.A. (acquired in 1948) and his law degree, LL.B., which he received in 1950. He was admitted to the bar in 1950 and began the practice of law in Pueblo. He served as member of the Colorado House of Representatives from 1961 to 1964.

U.S. House
Evans was elected as a Democrat to the Eighty-ninth and to the six succeeding Congresses (January 3, 1965 – January 3, 1979). He was not a candidate for reelection in 1978 to the Ninety-sixth Congress.

Legacy
Until his death he was a resident of Beulah, Colorado.

In 1970, he was instrumental in having the Federal Citizen Information Center established in Pueblo. After Evans’ death in 2010, President Barack Obama signed a law renaming the building the “Congressman Frank Evans Government Printing Office Distribution Center.” It is also known as the Frank Evans Government Printing Office Building.

References

Obituary in Denver Post

1923 births
2010 deaths
Democratic Party members of the Colorado House of Representatives
United States Navy pilots of World War II
Democratic Party members of the United States House of Representatives from Colorado
20th-century American politicians
Pomona College alumni
People from Pueblo, Colorado
Military personnel from Colorado